Valéry Sanou (born 19 December 1989) is a Burkinabé footballer who plays for State Envoys FC.

Career
Sanou began his career with Etoile Filante Ouagadougou who won in his first professional season 2007/2008 the Burkinabé SuperCup and Coupe du Faso. He signed than in March 2009 for Muangthong United F.C. in the Thai Premier League who played between June 2009 now played one month for Yadanabon FC in the Myanmar National League, before in July 2009 signed for Sriracha FC. In summer 2011 returned to Africa and signed with Ghanaian Poly Tank Division One League Kumasi based State Envoys FC.

Honours
2005: Burkinabé SuperCup
2006: Coupe du Faso
2008: Burkinabé Premier League
2008: Coupe du Faso

References

1989 births
Living people
Malian footballers
Valery Sanou
Expatriate footballers in Myanmar
Sportspeople from Ouagadougou
Expatriate footballers in Thailand
Étoile Filante de Ouagadougou players
Yadanarbon F.C. players
Expatriate footballers in Ghana
Burkinabé expatriate sportspeople in Thailand
Association football midfielders
21st-century Burkinabé people
21st-century Malian people